Hans Pfeiffer is a physicist best known for his contribution to the development of electron beam lithography.

Life 
Dr. Pfeiffer received his Ph.D. from the Technical University of Berlin, Germany in 1967 and joined IBM the following year. During his career he established a world class team and led the development of several generations of IBM's electron-beam lithography systems. He is recognized for building the industry's first shaped beam lithography systems.

Dr. Pfeiffer was elected IBM Fellow in 1985.

References 
 Biography in IBM Journal of Research and Development
 Biography at CEI-Europe

Year of birth missing (living people)
Living people
IBM Fellows
Technical University of Berlin alumni